Jelano Cruden (born 7 July 1988) is an Aruban professional footballer who played for the Aruba national team from 2008–2015.

He debuted internationally on 26 March 2008, in a match against Antigua and Barbuda in a 2010 FIFA World Cup qualification in South Africa in a 1-0 defeat.

On 12 July 2011, he played a match against St. Lucia, for the 2014 FIFA World Cup qualification in Brazil, with a 4-2 defeat. In a 6-6 aggregate, he missed a penalty goal in the penalty shootout, in an eventual defeat to St. Lucia.

He last appeared in the 2018 FIFA World Cup qualification in Russia, where he played against Barbados.

References

External links
 
 

1988 births
Living people
Aruban footballers
Aruba international footballers
Aruba under-20 international footballers
Association football forwards
SV River Plate Aruba players
Quick 1888 players